Dasht-e Murt-e Olya (also Romanized as Dasht-e Mūrt-e ‘Olyā) is a village in Qalkhani Rural District, Gahvareh District, Dalahu County, Kermanshah Province, Iran. At the 2006 census, its population was 94, in 16 families.

References 

Populated places in Dalahu County